Cow Country is a 1953 American Western film directed by Lesley Selander and written by Adele Buffington and Thomas W. Blackburn. The film stars Edmond O'Brien, Helen Westcott, Robert Lowery, Barton MacLane, Peggie Castle, Robert Barrat and James Millican. The film was released on April 26, 1953, by Allied Artists Pictures.

Plot
Ben Anthony runs a freight line in Texas. He disappointed cattleman Walt Garnet by not going into that business. Walt's beautiful daughter Linda returns to town after a long absence and Ben still carries a torch for her, but she's now involved with another man, Harry Odell.

The cattle business is in trouble. Beef prices have dropped so low, cattle companies are being urged to sell their stock to a rendering plant. Ben tries to intervene, and eventually learns that banker Parker is colluding with Odell and the plant's owner, Sledge, to gain control of the ranchers' valuable land.

Melba Sykes and her father Tim are squatting on Walt's ranch. It turns out that Odell is not only hiding his business schemes from Linda but also the fact that he's been romancing Melba behind her back. Tim Sykes is killed, and when Sledge produces a bill of sale from the man, Ben knows it's been forged because Tim did not know how to write.

Melba boasts to Linda that her lover Odell will look out for her interest now. Linda realizes she's been betrayed and turns to Ben for solace and advice. Melba becomes furious when Odell breaks off their relationship and snaps a bullwhip at him.

A showdown ensues in a box canyon, where Parker and Sledge are planning to destroy the cattle they have rustled. Ben gets there in time to shoot them both. He is wounded himself, but will survive and also will now have Linda.

Cast
Edmond O'Brien as Ben Anthony
Helen Westcott as Linda Garnet
Robert Lowery as Harry Odell 
Barton MacLane as Marvin Parker
Peggie Castle as Melba Sykes
Robert Barrat as Walt Garnet
James Millican as Fritz Warner
Don Beddoe as Joe Davis
Robert J. Wilke as Sledge
Raymond Hatton as Smokey
Chuck Courtney as Tom 
Steve Clark as Skeeter
Rory Mallinson as Tim Sykes
Marshall Reed as Riley
Chuck Roberson as Stubby
Tom Tyler as Pete
Sam Flint as Maitland
Jack Ingram as Terrell
George J. Lewis as Sanchez

References

External links
 

1953 films
1950s English-language films
American Western (genre) films
1953 Western (genre) films
Films directed by Lesley Selander
American black-and-white films
1950s American films